Molecular surface may refer to one of the following.

The Van der Waals surface
Accessible surface area or Connolly surface
Any of isosurfaces for a molecule